Carlos Rodríguez (7 January 1909 – 17 October 1986) was a Mexican sports shooter. He competed in the 25 m pistol event at the 1952 Summer Olympics.

References

External links
 

1909 births
1986 deaths
Mexican male sport shooters
Olympic shooters of Mexico
Shooters at the 1952 Summer Olympics
Place of birth missing
20th-century Mexican people